West Kent (formally known as "Kent, Western") was a county constituency in Kent in South East England.  It returned two Members of Parliament (MPs) to the House of Commons of the Parliament of the United Kingdom, elected by the first past the post system.

History

The constituency was created by the Reform Act 1832 for the 1832 general election, and abolished by the Redistribution of Seats Act 1885 for the 1885 general election.

All three two-member constituencies in Kent were abolished in 1885: East Kent, Mid Kent and West Kent.  They were replaced by eight new single-member constituencies: Ashford, Dartford, Faversham, Isle of Thanet, Medway, St Augustine's, Sevenoaks and Tunbridge.

Boundaries
1832–1868: The Lathes of Sutton-at-Hone and Aylesford, and the Lower Division of the Lathe of Scray.

1868–1885: The Lathe of Sutton-at-Hone.

Members of Parliament

Election results

Elections in the 1830s

 Rider retired at the close of the first day's poll

Geary resigned, causing a by-election.

Elections in the 1840s

Marsham succeeded to the peerage, becoming 3rd Earl of Romney and causing a by-election.

Elections in the 1850s

 
 

Filmer's death caused a by-election.

Elections in the 1860s

Elections in the 1870s

 
 
 

Talbot resigned in order to contest the 1878 Oxford University by-election.

Elections in the 1880s

 

Legge was appointed Vice-Chamberlain of the Household, requiring a by-election.

References 

Parliamentary constituencies in Kent (historic)
Constituencies of the Parliament of the United Kingdom established in 1832
Constituencies of the Parliament of the United Kingdom disestablished in 1885